Mount Reynolds, is a 2,004-metre (6,575-feet) mountain in the Murray Range of the Hart Ranges in Northern British Columbia.

References 

Two-thousanders of British Columbia
Northern Interior of British Columbia
Canadian Rockies
Cariboo Land District